Bryde may refer to:

People
 Brun-Otto Bryde born 1943), German jurist
 Johan Bryde (1858–1925), Norwegian ship-owner, whaler and businessman
 Vilhelm Bryde (1888–1974),Swedish actor and art director
 Bryde, stage name of Welsh singer-songwriter Sarah Howells

Places

 Lake Bryde-East Lake Bryde,  a freshwater wetland system in Western Australia
 Bryde Island, an island in Canada
 Bryde Island (Antarctica)

Other uses

 Bryde's whale

See also
 Bride (disambiguation)
 MacBryde (disambiguation)
 McBryde (disambiguation)